Speleogobius trigloides, also known as the Grotto goby, is a species of goby native to the Mediterranean Sea where it is known to inhabit grottoes at depths of from . This species grows to a length of  SL.

References

trigloides
Fish described in 1976